Qianshi hutong translated as money market hutong, is a Beijing hutong recognized as the narrowest in the city. The street is located near to Qianmen, in the Dongcheng district.

History 
During the Qing Dynasty, Qianshi was a financial center of monetary exchange, home to 26 mints producing copper coins for nearly every bank in the city.  The lane narrowed as these banks expanded. After the establishment of the People's Republic of China in 1949, the lane lost its function following the reformation of the monetary system and the production of paper currency.

References

Streets in Beijing